Donald Shane Holmes (born 5 January 1959) is a former Australian rules footballer who was played in the West Australian Football League (WAFL) for  and in the Victorian Football League (VFL) for .

Playing career
A local boy from Bassendean Holmes made his debut in 1978 at nineteen years of age. He represented Swan Districts in four WAFL Grand Final sides playing in the forward line either as a forward pocket or a half forward flank. Holmes kicked two goals in the 1982 and 1983 grand final and five goals in the 1984 grand final. He was also selected in the 1984 WA State team.

In 1987 Holmes was recruited by the West Coast Eagles and was part of their inaugural team and played for them for three seasons playing 23 games and kicking 40 goals.

Holmes played his final season in 1990 and was part of the victorious Swan Districts side. He played a total of 181 senior games and kicked a total of 363 goals.

He is listed in the Swan Districts Team of the Century as an interchange player. Coach John Todd rated Holmes and his mate Don Langsford as having achieved more than anyone else at Swan Districts in that they played in four winning premiership teams
.

References

External links
 
 
Don Holmes player profile page at WAFL FootyFacts

Swan Districts Football Club players
West Coast Eagles players
Living people
Australian rules footballers from Western Australia
1959 births